S. indicum may refer to:
 Schistosoma indicum, a blood-fluke species
 Sesamum indicum, the sesame, a flowering plant species

See also
 Indicum (disambiguation)